Terri Lynn Williams (born November 1956) is an American Republican politician who has represented Essex-Caledonia in the Vermont House of Representatives since 2020.

In 2022, she defeated fellow Republican incumbent John Kascenska in the primary. She contested the 2022 general election unopposed.

References 

Living people
1956 births
21st-century American women politicians
Republican Party members of the Vermont House of Representatives
Women state legislators in Vermont
21st-century American politicians